Anthony Charles D. Wiggin (born 8 January 1950) is a British rower who competed in the 1980 Summer Olympics.

Rowing career
Wiggin was part of the quad scull that finished 7th overall after winning the B final at the 1977 World Rowing Championships in Amsterdam.

In 1978 Wiggin and his partner Malcolm Carmichael won the coxless pairs at the 1978 British Rowing Championships. Two years later the pair won the bronze medal in the coxless pairs event at the 1980 Olympics in Moscow.

References

1950 births
Living people
English male rowers
British male rowers
Olympic rowers of Great Britain
Rowers at the 1980 Summer Olympics
Olympic bronze medallists for Great Britain
Olympic medalists in rowing
Medalists at the 1980 Summer Olympics